is a Japanese multinational ceramics and electronics manufacturer headquartered in Kyoto, Japan. It manufactures industrial ceramics, solar power generating systems, telecommunications equipment, office document imaging equipment, electronic components, semiconductor packages, cutting tools, and components for medical and dental implant systems.

History

Origins to 2000
Kyocera's original product was a ceramic insulator known as a "kelcima" for use in television picture tubes. The company quickly adapted its technologies to produce an expanding range of ceramic components for electronic and structural applications.  In the 1960s, as the NASA space program, the birth of Silicon Valley and the advancement of computer technology created demand for semiconductor integrated circuits (ICs), Kyocera developed ceramic semiconductor packages that remain among its core product lines today.

In the mid-1970s, Kyocera began expanding its material technologies to produce a diverse range of applied ceramic products, including solar photovoltaic modules; biocompatible tooth- and joint-replacement systems; industrial cutting tools; consumer ceramics, such as ceramic-bladed kitchen knives and ceramic-tipped ballpoint pens; and lab-grown gemstones, including rubies, emeralds, sapphires, opals, alexandrites and padparadschahs.

The company acquired electronic equipment manufacturing and radio communication technologies in 1979 through an investment in Cybernet Electronics Corporation, which was merged into Kyocera in 1982.  Shortly afterward, Kyocera introduced one of the first portable, battery-powered laptop computers, sold in the U.S. as the Tandy Model 100, which featured an LCD screen and telephone-modem data transfer capability.

Kyocera gained optical technologies by acquiring Yashica Company, Limited in 1983, along with Yashica's prior licensing agreement with Carl Zeiss, and manufactured film and digital cameras under the Kyocera, Yashica and Contax trade names until 2005, when the company discontinued all film and digital camera production.

In the 1980s, Kyocera marketed audio components, such as CD players, receivers, turntables, and cassette decks.  These featured unique elements, including Kyocera ceramic-based platforms, and are sought by collectors to the present day.  At one time, Kyocera owned the famous KLH brand founded by Henry Kloss, though Kloss and the original Cambridge design and engineering staff had left the company by the time of the Kyocera purchase.  In 1989, Kyocera stopped production of audio components and sought a buyer for the KLH brand.

In 1989, Kyocera acquired Elco Corporation, a manufacturer of electronic connectors. In 1990, Kyocera's global operations expanded significantly with the addition of AVX Corporation, a global manufacturer of passive electronic components, such as ceramic chip capacitors, filters and voltage suppressors.

Expanding sales of photovoltaic solar energy products led the company to create Kyocera Solar Corporation in Japan in 1996, and Kyocera Solar, Inc. in the U.S. in 1999.

On August 4, 1999, Kyocera completed its merger with solar energy systems integrator Golden Genesis Company (Nasdaq:GGGO).

2000 to present

In January 2000, Kyocera acquired photocopier manufacturer Mita Industrial Company, following Mita's decline and bankruptcy in the late 1990s. This resulted in the creation of Kyocera Mita Corporation (now Kyocera Document Solutions Corporation), headquartered in Osaka, Japan, with subsidiaries in more than 25 nations.

Also in 2000, Kyocera acquired the mobile phone manufacturing operations of Qualcomm Incorporated to form Kyocera Wireless Corp. In 2003, Kyocera Wireless Corp. established Kyocera Wireless India (KWI), a mobile phone subsidiary in Bangalore. KWI has established alliances with several leading players providing CDMA services in India. Kyocera Wireless Corporation was the first to combine BREW capabilities and enhanced brilliant Color displays on entry-level CDMA Handsets, when it demonstrated BREW-enabled handsets at the BREW 2003 Developers Conference.

In 2008, Kyocera acquired Sanyo Mobile, the mobile phone division of Sanyo Electric Co., Ltd., and its associated operations in Japan, the United States and Canada.

In April 2009, Kyocera unveiled its EOS concept phone at CTIA, with an OLED and which is powered by kinetic energy from the user. The prototype phone also has a foldable design which is capable of morphing into a variety of shapes.

In 2009 Kyocera sold its Indian R&D Division (Wireless) to Mindtree Limited.

In March 2010, Kyocera launched its first Smartphone (Zio) since 2001, after focusing on lower cost phones.

In March, 2010, Kyocera announced the merger of its two wholly owned subsidiaries: San Diego-based Kyocera Wireless Corp. and Kyocera Communications, Inc. The merged enterprise continued under the name Kyocera Communications, Inc.

In June 2010, Kyocera acquired part of the thin film transistor (TFT) liquid crystal display (LCD) design and manufacturing business of Sony Corporation's subsidiary Sony Mobile Display Corporation.

In October 2010, Kyocera acquired 100% ownership of the shares of TA Triumph-Adler AG (Nuremberg, Germany) and converted the daughter company into TA Triumph-Adler GmbH. TA Triumph-Adler GmbH currently distributes Kyocera-made printing devices and software with TA Triumph-Adler and UTAX trademarks within the EMEA (Europe-Middle East-Africa) region. TA Triumph-Adler GmbH is located in Nuremberg, Germany and UTAX GmbH (subsidiary of TA Triumph-Adler) in Norderstedt, Germany.

In July 2011, Kyocera's wholly owned Germany-based subsidiary Kyocera Fineceramics GmbH acquired 100% ownership of the shares in Denmark-based industrial cutting tool manufacturing and sales company Unimerco Group A/S. The company name has since been changed to Kyocera Unimerco A/S.

In February 2012, Kyocera became the total stock holder of Optrex Corporation, which was subsequently renamed Kyocera Display Corporation.

In March 2016, Kyocera acquired an international cutting tool company called SGS Tool Company for $89 million.

In November, 2020, Kyocera acquired a light source company called SLD laser. The company innovated a product that uses phosphor to converts blue laser light to produces a broad-spectrum, incoherent, high luminance white light sources.

Main products

Printers and multi-function devices

Kyocera Document Solutions Corporation manufactures a wide range of printers, MFPs. and toner cartridges which are sold throughout Europe, the Middle East, Africa, Australia and the Americas. Kyocera printing devices are also marketed under the Copystar name in Americas and under TA Triumph-Adler and Utax names in EMEA (Europe-Middle East-Africa) region. This division is over seen by Aaron Thomas (North American division President), Henry Goode, and Adam Stevens

Satellite phones
In the past, Kyocera manufactured satellite phones for the Iridium network. Three handsets were released in 1999 including one with an unusual docking station which contained the Iridium transceiver and antenna, as well as a pager for the Iridium network.

Mobile phones

North America (Kyocera International, Inc.)

Kyocera manufactures mobile phones for wireless carriers in the United States and Canada. Marketing is done by its subsidiary Kyocera International, Inc.

Kyocera acquired the terminal business of US digital communications technology company Qualcomm in February 2000, and became a major supplier of mobile handsets. In 2008, Kyocera also took over the handset business of Sanyo, eventually forming 'Kyocera Communications, Inc.'. The Kyocera Communications terminal division is located in San Diego.

Japan
Kyocera Corporation manufactures and markets phones for the Japanese market which are sold under different brands. Kyocera makes phones for some Japanese wireless carriers including au, willcom, SoftBank and Y!mobile.

In May 2012, Kyocera released the world's first speaker-less smartphone, the Kyocera Urbano Progresso. This phone produces vibration to conduct sound through the ear canal instead of the customary speaker, making it easier to hear phone conversations in busy and noisy places. This also benefits those who are having difficulty hearing, but are not totally deaf. It can be used across the world with CDMA, GSM, GPRS and UMTS antennas. This phone is only available in Japan.

Solar cells

Kyocera maintains production bases for photovoltaic cells and solar modules in Japan and China. In 2009, it was announced that Kyocera's solar modules were available as on option on the Toyota Prius.

The company also operates solar power plants, such as the Kagoshima Nanatsujima Mega Solar Power Plant.

Advanced ceramics

Kyocera sells ceramic knives via its web store and retail outlets under the name Kyocera Advanced Ceramics.

Corporate affairs
A 1,900-panel photovoltaic power system is on the roof and south wall of the building, which can supply 12.5% of the facility's needed energy, generating, on a yearly basis, 182 megawatt hours.

Sponsorships 

Between 1978 and 1998, Kyocera and the International Affairs Board of the City of San Diego sponsored an all-expense paid tour of Japan for students from the United States called HORIZON (stylized in all capital letters and designated by year: e.g. HORIZON '98). The program's purpose was to acquaint these students with the country of Japan, its people and their culture - and to promote friendship and understanding. The program was open to students ages 10 – 14 who filled out the application and were chosen in a random drawing of all those that apply.

The brand Mita was the first main sponsor of the Argentinian team Atlético Independiente. This relationship was maintained from 1985 to 1992.

Kyocera is currently the sponsor of the soccer club Kyoto Sanga F.C. of the J-League (its hometown team; here the word "Kyocera" is written in Japanese, everywhere else in the Latinized logo).

In Japan, Kyocera holds the naming rights for the Kyocera Dome Osaka, colloquially known as Osaka Dome. The indoor dome is the home field of the baseball teams Orix Buffaloes and Hanshin Tigers.

Between 2005 and 2008, Kyocera also sponsored Reading F.C. During this period Reading won the Football League Championship with a record 106 points.

Also between 2005 and 2008, Kyocera was the sponsor of Brazilian football team Atlético Paranaense, and acquired the naming rights of their stadium.

Gallery of products

See also
Cybernet (brand)
Kyoto Prize
Taito
List of digital camera brands

References

External links

Kyocera Global site
Kyocera Communications, Inc. site
Kyotronic 85
Kyocera Plans to Build 350-MW Solar Cell Manufacturing Plant
Kyocera Constructing New Solar Manufacturing Plant In China
Top 5 Best Kyocera Photocopiers

 
Electronics companies of Japan
Solar energy companies of Japan
Mobile phone manufacturers
Photovoltaics manufacturers
Conglomerate companies of Japan
Defense companies of Japan
Midori-kai
Multinational companies headquartered in Japan
Computer printer companies
Conglomerate companies established in 1959
Electronics companies established in 1959
Manufacturing companies established in 1959
Manufacturing companies based in Kyoto
Companies listed on the Osaka Exchange
Companies listed on the Tokyo Stock Exchange
Japanese brands
Japanese companies established in 1959
Knife manufacturing companies
1970s initial public offerings